Eye is the joint fourth studio album by Japanese rock band Sekai no Owari, released on February 27, 2019, by Toy's Factory. It was released simultaneously with the album Lip. The limited first run of the album contains a DVD with footage from the band's Insomnia Train outdoor concert tour. The band will tour in support of the albums from April 2019. It debuted at number two on the Japanese Oricon Albums Chart on March 6, behind Lip at number one.

Background
The band recorded enough material across the four years from their previous album Tree (2015), so decided to release it across two separate albums, with Eye showcasing the band's "wild side", and Lip featuring the band's "signature pop" songs.

The songs "Anti-Hero", "SOS", "Stargazer" and "Re:set" were released prior to the album.

Promotion
"Re:set" was used as the theme for the video game Catherine: Full Body.

Track listing

Notes
Nelson Babin-coy provided support as a consultant for English lyrics written in tracks 3, 5, and 7.

Charts

Weekly charts

Year-end charts

References

2019 albums
Japanese-language albums
Sekai no Owari albums